George Washington Wurts (1843 in Philadelphia – January 25, 1928 in Rome) was an American diplomat and art collector.

Early life 
George Washington Wurts was one of eight children of William Wurts of Trenton, New Jersey. William Wurts, who with his brothers founded the Delaware and Hudson Canal Company, left a significant inheritance to his children on his death in 1858.

Diplomatic career 
In 1865 Wurts moved from Philadelphia to Florence, Italy and became an assistant to George Perkins Marsh. Marsh, the first United States minister to the Kingdom of Italy, found the young Wurts to be "cultivated, hard-working, descreet, intensely loyal" and in 1869 Wurts became the Secretary of Legation, a position which he held even after Marsh's departure in 1881 when he was 81 years old. In 1882 Wurts was assigned to St Petersburg, Russia and remained in his post there until 1892 when he was transferred back to Italy. Wurts time in the diplomatic services spanned about thirty years, although he never fulfilled his ambition to become an ambassador.

Art collection 

Wurts married Henrietta Tower in 1898 and the couple moved to Rome in 1902. With her inherited fortune, Tower assisted Wurts in the acquisition of the Villa Sciarra-Wurts (Rome) and in its decoration. Together they expanded his already significant art collection, which he began in 1876, to approximately 4,000 works. The collection includes ceramics, textiles, tapestries, 19th-century Russian hats, stuffed bears, 80 wooden statues from Germany, and a variety of paintings (including works by Ottaviano Nelli, Vincenzo Pagani, and Paolo Veneziano). The collection also includes works from China and Japan. Wurts died in 1928 and by 1933 Tower had donated their villa to the Italian state. Following her death, their art collection was also donated to Italy, with the proviso that it remain in a museum. The collection was moved to the Museo nazionale del Palazzo di Venezia where it remains today.

References

External links 
 Museo Nazionale Piazza Venezia
 Henrietta Tower Wurts Foundation

American art collectors
1843 births
1928 deaths
American expatriates in Italy
American diplomats